The Bangladesh cricket team toured South Africa in March and April 2022 to play two Tests and three One Day International (ODI) matches. The Test series formed part of the 2021–2023 ICC World Test Championship, and the ODI series formed part of the inaugural 2020–2023 ICC Cricket World Cup Super League. On 9 February 2022, Cricket South Africa confirmed the schedule and venues for the series.

Bangladesh won the first ODI by 38 runs, recording their first win against the hosts in an international cricket match in South Africa. South Africa won the second ODI by seven wickets, with Kagiso Rabada taking his second five-wicket haul in an ODI match. Bangladesh won the third ODI by nine wickets, with Taskin Ahmed also taking a five-wicket haul. As a result, Bangladesh won the series 2–1, giving them their first ODI series win in South Africa.

South Africa won the first Test match by 220 runs. In the second innings Keshav Maharaj took seven wickets for 32 runs, with Bangladesh being bowled out for 53 runs, their second-lowest total in Test cricket. All of Bangladesh's wickets were taken by spin bowling, from Maharaj and Simon Harmer. It was the first time that just two bowlers had taken all ten wickets in an innings for South Africa in a Test match. It was also the first time in more than 100 years that zero deliveries were bowled by seam bowlers in a completed innings for South Africa.

On the morning of the fourth day of the second Test match, Sarel Erwee and Wiaan Mulder were replaced by Glenton Stuurman and Khaya Zondo as COVID-19 substitutes. It was the first time that COVID-19 substitutes had been used in Test cricket, with Khaya Zondo making his Test debut in the process. South Africa won the match by 332 runs, winning the series 2–0.

Squads

Prior to the tour, Shakib Al Hasan had requested a break from international cricket, with the Bangladesh Cricket Board (BCB) initially agreeing to his request. However, after a meeting with the BCB's President, Nazmul Hassan, Shakib agreed to travel to South Africa. Shakib eventually missed the Test series, after several family members were admitted to hospital due to COVID-19. During the first Test, the BCB confirmed that both Taskin Ahmed and Shoriful Islam would return home to Bangladesh following the conclusion of the match due to injuries.

In March 2022, Cricket South Africa (CSA) agreed to allow their Test-playing cricketers to choose between the matches against Bangladesh or playing in the 2022 Indian Premier League (IPL), with a unanimous vote for them to play in the IPL. As a result, South Africa named a weakened squad for the Test matches, with Marco Jansen, Aiden Markram, Lungi Ngidi, Anrich Nortje, Kagiso Rabada and Rassie van der Dussen all playing in the IPL.

ODI series

1st ODI

2nd ODI

3rd ODI

Test series

1st Test

2nd Test

Notes

References

External links
 Series home at ESPN Cricinfo

2022 in Bangladeshi cricket
2022 in South African cricket
International cricket competitions in 2021–22
Bangladeshi cricket tours of South Africa